Fausto Vicente Quinde Vizcaíno (born February 13, 1976, in Cuenca, Azuay) is a male race walker from Ecuador. He competed for his native country at the 2003 Pan American Games and the 2008 Summer Olympics.

He was the bronze medalist at the Pan American Race Walking Cup in 2007 and has represented Ecuador at the IAAF World Race Walking Cup.

Achievements

References

1976 births
Living people
People from Cuenca, Ecuador
Ecuadorian male racewalkers
Athletes (track and field) at the 2003 Pan American Games
Athletes (track and field) at the 2008 Summer Olympics
Olympic athletes of Ecuador
Pan American Games competitors for Ecuador